The 2019–20 Middle Tennessee Blue Raiders men's basketball team represented Middle Tennessee State University during the 2019–20 NCAA Division I men's basketball season. The Blue Raiders, led by second-year head coach Nick McDevitt, played their home games at the Murphy Center in Murfreesboro, Tennessee as members of Conference USA. They finished the season 8–23, 4–14 in C-USA play to finish in last place. They failed to qualify for the C-USA tournament.

Previous season 
The Blue Raiders finished the 2018–19 season 11–21 overall, 8–10 in C-USA play to finish in a tie for ninth place. In the C-USA tournament, they were defeated in the first round by UAB.

Roster

Schedule and results

|-
!colspan=9 style=| Non-conference regular season

|-
!colspan=9 style=| C-USA regular season

Schedule Source:

References

Middle Tennessee Blue Raiders men's basketball seasons
Middle Tennessee
Middle Tennessee Blue Raiders
Middle Tennessee Blue Raiders